Caillavet may refer to:
 Caillavet, Gers, a French commune

People with the surname
 Henri Caillavet, French politician of the Fourth Republic
 Gaston Arman de Caillavet, French playwright